is a private junior college in Tsu, Mie, Japan. It was established as a junior college in 1966. It became coeducational in April 1997.

External links
  

Private universities and colleges in Japan
Japanese junior colleges
Universities and colleges in Mie Prefecture
Tsu, Mie